is a Japanese voice actor. He was born in Tokyo, and works for 81 Produce. He is the official Japanese dubbing voice for Shaggy Rogers in the Scooby-Doo franchise.

Filmography

Television animation
Dragon Quest (1989) (Mokomoko)
Nadia: The Secret of Blue Water (1990) (Hanson, King)
Honō no Tōkyūji: Dodge Danpei (1991) (Ozaki)
Iron Virgin Jun (From 1992) (Black Skin Waiter)
Tenchi in Tokyo (1997) (Kazuhiko Amagasaki)
The Heroic Legend of Arslan (2015) (Inokentis VII)
Maho Girls PreCure! (2016) (Isaac)

Unknown date
Bleach (Tatsufusa Enjōji)
Gunparade March (Mitsuhiro Nakamura)
Hunter × Hunter (2011) (Tonpa)
Infinite Ryvius (Charlie (Good Turtleland III), Akihiro Miyabi)
Kaiji (Mamoru Andō)
Law of Ueki (Bastero)
Magical Princess Minky Momo (Cookbook)
Mutant Turtles: Superman Legend (Michelangelo)
Naruto (Poccha)
Naruto Shippuden (Gamariki)
Otaku no Video (Tanaka)
Police Academy: The Animated Series (Eugene Tackleberry)
Tenchi Muyo! (OVA) (Kazuhiko Amagasaki)
The Doraemons (Dora-nichov)
The World is Still Beautiful (Teteru Remercier)
Yu-Gi-Oh! Duel Monsters GX (Iwamaru)

Video Games
Lego Dimensions (2015, Japanese-dubbed version) (Shaggy Rogers)

Tokusatsu
 Gekisou Sentai Carranger (Space Cockroach Goki-Chan/GG Goki-Chan/II Goki-Chan)
 Denji Sentai Megaranger (Rhinoceros Nejire (ep. 3))
 B-Robo Kabutack (Postbox)
 Seijuu Sentai Gingaman (Bombs (ep. 36))
 Kyuukyuu Sentai GoGo-V (Reward Psyma Beast Garaga (ep. 16))
 Ninpuu Sentai Hurricaneger (Dimensional Ninja Futabutabo (ep. 7))
 Bakuryuu Sentai Abaranger (Trinoid 16: Tsutakotatsu (ep. 27))
 Tokusou Sentai Dekaranger (Reversian Bon-Goblin Hells (ep. 21 - 22))
 Engine Sentai Go-onger (Savage Land Barbaric Machine Beast Jishaku Banki (ep. 5)/Denjishaku Banki (ep. 5))
 Samurai Sentai Shinkenger (Ayakashi Oinogare (ep. 19))
 Tokumei Sentai Go-Busters (Wataameloid (ep. 24))

Dubbing roles

Live-action
Jonah Hill
Knocked Up (Jonah)
Superbad (Seth)
Forgetting Sarah Marshall (Matthew Van Der Wyk)
Get Him to the Greek (Aaron Green)
Moneyball (Peter Brand)
The Wolf of Wall Street (Donnie Azoff)
Armageddon (2004 NTV edition) (Max Lennert (Ken Hudson Campbell))
Beethoven (Harvey (Oliver Platt))
Beethoven's 2nd (Floyd (Chris Penn))
Cradle 2 the Grave (Tommy (Anthony Anderson))
Cube (Kazan (Andrew Miller))
Evolution (2005 NTV edition) (Deke Donald (Ethan Suplee))
Exit Wounds (T. K. Johnson (Anthony Anderson))
Flyboys (Briggs Lowry (Tyler Labine))
Focus (Farhad (Adrian Martinez))
Jurassic Park (Dennis Nedry (Wayne Knight))
Kangaroo Jack (Louis Booker (Anthony Anderson))
Mars Attacks! (Billy-Glen Norris (Jack Black))
Mighty Morphin Power Rangers (Bulk, Goldar)
Miss Congeniality (Agent Clonsky (John DiResta))
The Rocker (Matt Gadman (Josh Gad))
Shall We Dance? (Vern (Omar Benson Miller))
The Sorcerer's Apprentice (Bennet Zurrow (Omar Benson Miller))
Space Jam (Stan Podolak (Wayne Knight))
The World's End (Peter Page (Eddie Marsan))
The Wraith (1992 TV Asahi edition) (The Gutterboy (Jamie Bozian))
Young Adult (Matt Freehauf (Patton Oswalt))

Animation
Batman: The Brave and the Bold (Shaggy Rogers)
Darkwing Duck (Herb Muddlefoot)
Chicken Run (Fetcher)
Johnny Bravo (Shaggy Rogers) (Episode: Bravo Dooby Doo)
Scooby-Doo and the Alien Invaders (Shaggy Rogers)
Scooby-Doo and the Cyber Chase (Shaggy Rogers)
Scooby-Doo and Scrappy-Doo (Shaggy Rogers) (Cartoon Network Japan dub)
Scooby-Doo! and the Witch's Ghost (Shaggy Rogers)
Scooby-Doo on Zombie Island (Shaggy Rogers)
Scooby-Doo, Where Are You! (Shaggy Rogers) (Cartoon Network Japan dub)
Teenage Mutant Ninja Turtles (Michaelangelo)
Teenage Mutant Ninja Turtles ('87 Michelangelo)
Thomas & Friends (Harvey) (Succeeding Hikaru Midorikawa)

References

External links
 

1964 births
81 Produce voice actors
Living people
Japanese male voice actors
Male voice actors from Tokyo